Songbird is a 2008 Philippine television variety show broadcast by GMA Network. Hosted by Regine Velasquez, it premiered on May 15, 2008. The show concluded on August 9, 2008 with a total of 14 episodes. It was replaced by Nuts Entertainment in its timeslot.

References

2008 Philippine television series debuts
2008 Philippine television series endings
Filipino-language television shows
GMA Network original programming
Philippine variety television shows